Helisul Linhas Aéreas S/A was a Brazilian airline founded in 1994. In 1996 it was sold to TAM Transportes Aéreos Regionais, which incorporated the airline in 1998.

History
On October 5, 1972, Tropical Táxi Aéreo was founded in Foz do Iguaçu. It was a subsidiary of Tropical Hotéis, a company part of the same holding that owned Varig. This was later by Eloy Biesuz and the name changed to Helisul Táxi Aéreo Ltda.

As part of its growing activities, Helisul Taxi Aéreo founded on May 16, 1994 Helisul Linhas Aéreas, as a charter airline operating regular flights and with operations concentrated at Curitiba-Bacacheri Airport linking Curitiba to other cities in Paraná state. On January 1, 1995 its license was updated to one of a regional carrier.

On July 1, 1996 Helisul was sold to TAM Airlines and it began operating feeder services to TAM. Later, in December of the same year, as Brasil Central Linhas Aéreas was rebranded as TAM-Meridional, Helisul was also rebranded as TAM Express and received the entire Caravan fleet of Brasil Central to operate its former network. In 1998 it was completely incorporated by TAM.

Helisul Táxi Aéreo still operates helicopter flights in Rio de Janeiro and Foz do Iguaçu and has certified maintenance plants at Curitiba-Bacacheri Airport.

Destinations
Helisul served the following cities: 
Blumenau
Campo Mourão – Cel. Geraldo Guias de Aquino Airport
Cascavel – Adalberto Mendes da Silva Airport
Chapecó – Serafin Enoss Bertaso Airport
Concórdia – Olavo Cecco Rigon Airport
Curitiba – Bacacheri Airport
Francisco Beltrão – Paulo Abdala Airport
Guarapuava – Tancredo Thomas de Faria Airport
Joaçaba – Santa Terezinha Airport
Pato Branco – Juvenal Loureiro Cardoso Airport
São Miguel do Oeste – Hélio Wasum Airport
São Paulo – Congonhas Airport

Fleet

Airline affinity program
Helisul did not have an airline affinity program.

Accidents and incidents
13 September 1996: an Embraer EMB 110 Bandeirante registration PT-WAV operating a cargo flight from Porto Alegre to Joinville collided with a hill and crashed during final approach to land at Joinville. The crew of two died.

See also

 TAM - Transportes Aéreos Regionais
List of defunct airlines of Brazil

References

External links
Helisul accidents as per Aviation Safety Database

Defunct airlines of Brazil
Airlines established in 1994
Airlines disestablished in 1998
1994 establishments in Brazil